The Childress House is a historic house in Fayetteville, Tennessee. It was built for the Childress family in the 1820s. It is listed on the National Register of Historic Places.

History
The house was built in 1825 for Reps Osborne Childress, a settler whose father had received a land grant for his service in the American Revolutionary War. Childress had a wife, Sarah, and eight children. After his death, the house was inherited by his son Marion Childress, who served as a major during the American Civil War. By the 1980s, it belonged to a descendant of the Childress family, Fred M. Lamon Jr.

Architectural significance
The portico, with two columns, was built in the 1840s. The house has been listed on the National Register of Historic Places since February 25, 1982.

References

Houses on the National Register of Historic Places in Tennessee
National Register of Historic Places in Lincoln County, Tennessee
Houses completed in 1825